The 3rd constituency of the Pyrénées-Atlantiques (French: Troisième circonscription des Pyrénées-Atlantiques) is a French legislative constituency in Pyrénées-Atlantiques département. Like the other 576 French constituencies, it elects one MP using the two-round system, with a run-off if no candidate receives over 50% of the vote in the first round.

Deputies

Election results

2022

 
 
 
 
 
 
 
|-
| colspan="8" bgcolor="#E9E9E9"|
|-
 
 

 
 
 
 
 

* PS dissident

2017 

|- style="background-color:#E9E9E9;text-align:center;"
! colspan="2" rowspan="2" style="text-align:left;" | Candidate
! rowspan="2" colspan="2" style="text-align:left;" | Party
! colspan="2" | 1st round
! colspan="2" | 2nd round
|- style="background-color:#E9E9E9;text-align:center;"
! width="75" | Votes
! width="30" | %
! width="75" | Votes
! width="30" | %
|-
| style="background-color:" |
| style="text-align:left;" | Michel Bernos
| style="text-align:left;" | La République En Marche!
| LREM
| 
| 29.79
| 
| 46.04
|-
| style="background-color:" |
| style="text-align:left;" | David Habib
| style="text-align:left;" | Socialist Party
| PS
| 
| 25.42
| 
| 53.96
|-
| style="background-color:" |
| style="text-align:left;" | Eric Lytwyn
| style="text-align:left;" | La France Insoumise
| FI
| 
| 10.96
| colspan="2" style="text-align:left;" |
|-
| style="background-color:" |
| style="text-align:left;" | Lucinda Carvalho
| style="text-align:left;" | National Front
| FN
| 
| 8.80
| colspan="2" style="text-align:left;" |
|-
| style="background-color:" |
| style="text-align:left;" | Berard Dupont
| style="text-align:left;" | Union of Democrats and Independents
| UDI
| 
| 8.75
| colspan="2" style="text-align:left;" |
|-
| style="background-color:" |
| style="text-align:left;" | Pierre Saulnier
| style="text-align:left;" | The Republicans
| LR
| 
| 7.06
| colspan="2" style="text-align:left;" |
|-
| style="background-color:" |
| style="text-align:left;" | Isabelle Larrouy
| style="text-align:left;" | Communist Party
| PCF
| 
| 2.94
| colspan="2" style="text-align:left;" |
|-
| style="background-color:" |
| style="text-align:left;" | David Grosclaude
| style="text-align:left;" | Regionalist
| REG
| 
| 1.61
| colspan="2" style="text-align:left;" |
|-
| style="background-color:" |
| style="text-align:left;" | Edith Peyré
| style="text-align:left;" | Ecologist
| ECO
| 
| 1.55
| colspan="2" style="text-align:left;" |
|-
| style="background-color:" |
| style="text-align:left;" | Frédéric Pédedaut
| style="text-align:left;" | Miscellaneous Left
| DVG
| 
| 0.94
| colspan="2" style="text-align:left;" |
|-
| style="background-color:" |
| style="text-align:left;" | Eric Delteil
| style="text-align:left;" | Far Left
| EXG
| 
| 0.60
| colspan="2" style="text-align:left;" |
|-
| style="background-color:" |
| style="text-align:left;" | Eric Petetin
| style="text-align:left;" | Ecologist
| ECO
| 
| 0.56
| colspan="2" style="text-align:left;" |
|-
| style="background-color:" |
| style="text-align:left;" | Catherine Le Carrer
| style="text-align:left;" | Independent
| DIV
| 
| 0.52
| colspan="2" style="text-align:left;" |
|-
| style="background-color:" |
| style="text-align:left;" | Christian Marty
| style="text-align:left;" | Far Left
| EXG
| 
| 0.52
| colspan="2" style="text-align:left;" |
|-
| colspan="8" style="background-color:#E9E9E9;"|
|- style="font-weight:bold"
| colspan="4" style="text-align:left;" | Total
| 
| 100%
| 
| 100%
|-
| colspan="8" style="background-color:#E9E9E9;"|
|-
| colspan="4" style="text-align:left;" | Registered voters
| 
| style="background-color:#E9E9E9;"|
| 
| style="background-color:#E9E9E9;"|
|-
| colspan="4" style="text-align:left;" | Blank/Void ballots
| 
| 2.67%
| 
| 9.91%
|-
| colspan="4" style="text-align:left;" | Turnout
| 
| 56.87%
| 
| 52.92%
|-
| colspan="4" style="text-align:left;" | Abstentions
| 
| 43.13%
| 
| 47.08%
|-
| colspan="8" style="background-color:#E9E9E9;"|
|- style="font-weight:bold"
| colspan="6" style="text-align:left;" | Result
| colspan="2" style="background-color:" | PS HOLD
|}

2012

|- style="background-color:#E9E9E9;text-align:center;"
! colspan="2" rowspan="2" style="text-align:left;" | Candidate
! rowspan="2" colspan="2" style="text-align:left;" | Party
! colspan="2" | 1st round
|- style="background-color:#E9E9E9;text-align:center;"
! width="75" | Votes
! width="30" | %
|-
| style="background-color:" |
| style="text-align:left;" | David Habib
| style="text-align:left;" | Socialist Party
| PS
| 
| '''|-
| style="background-color:" |
| style="text-align:left;" | Béatrice Yrondi
| style="text-align:left;" | Union for a Popular Movement
| UMP
| 
| 17.86
|-
| style="background-color:" |
| style="text-align:left;" | Pascal Dussart
| style="text-align:left;" | National Front
| FN
| 
| 9.82
|-
| style="background-color:" |
| style="text-align:left;" | Claudine Bonhomme
| style="text-align:left;" | Left Front
| FG
| 
| 5.13
|-
| style="background-color:" |
| style="text-align:left;" | Sophie Bonnabaud
| style="text-align:left;" | Democratic Movement
| MoDEM
| 
| 4.30
|-
| style="background-color:" |
| style="text-align:left;" | David Grosclaude
| style="text-align:left;" | Occitan Party
| REG
| 
| 3.07
|-
| style="background-color:" |
| style="text-align:left;" | Stéphane Cômes
| style="text-align:left;" | Independent Ecological Movement
| MEI
| 
| 1.04
|-
| style="background-color:" |
| style="text-align:left;" | Jacques Naya
| style="text-align:left;" | Miscellaneous Right
| DVD
| 
| 0.82
|-
| style="background-color:" |
| style="text-align:left;" | Laurence Espinosa
| style="text-align:left;" | New Anticapitalist Party
| NPA
| 
| 0.55
|-
| style="background-color:" |
| style="text-align:left;" | Maria Loire
| style="text-align:left;" | Independent Ecological Alliance
| AEI
| 
| 0.46
|-
| style="background-color:" |
| style="text-align:left;" | Christian Marty
| style="text-align:left;" | Workers’ Struggle
| LO
| 
| 0.36
|-
| style="background-color:" |
| style="text-align:left;" | Pascal Mercher
| style="text-align:left;" | Independent Workers' Party
| POI
| 
| 0.28
|-
| colspan="6" style="background-color:#E9E9E9;"|
|- style="font-weight:bold"
| colspan="4" style="text-align:left;" | Total
| 
| 100%
|-
| colspan="6" style="background-color:#E9E9E9;"|
|-
| colspan="4" style="text-align:left;" | Registered voters
| 
| style="background-color:#E9E9E9;"|
|-
| colspan="4" style="text-align:left;" | Blank/Void ballots
| 
| 2.17%
|-
| colspan="4" style="text-align:left;" | Turnout
| 
| 62.96%
|-
| colspan="4" style="text-align:left;" | Abstentions
| 
| 37.04%
|-
| colspan="6" style="background-color:#E9E9E9;"|
|- style="font-weight:bold"
| colspan="4" style="text-align:left;" | Result
| colspan="2" style="background-color:" | PS HOLD
|}

2007

|- style="background-color:#E9E9E9;text-align:center;"
! colspan="2" rowspan="2" style="text-align:left;" | Candidate
! rowspan="2" colspan="2" style="text-align:left;" | Party
! colspan="2" | 1st round
! colspan="2" | 2nd round
|- style="background-color:#E9E9E9;text-align:center;"
! width="75" | Votes
! width="30" | %
! width="75" | Votes
! width="30" | %
|-
| style="background-color:" |
| style="text-align:left;" | David Habib
| style="text-align:left;" | Socialist Party
| PS
| | 44.56| | 62.50|-
| style="background-color:" |
| style="text-align:left;" | Laurence Sailliet
| style="text-align:left;" | Union for a Popular Movement
| UMP
| | 27.55| 
| 37.50
|-
| style="background-color:" |
| style="text-align:left;" | Chantal Petriat
| style="text-align:left;" | UDF-Democratic Movement
| UDF-MoDem
| 
| 14.74
| colspan="2" style="text-align:left;" |
|-
| style="background-color:" |
| style="text-align:left;" | Hervé Cabannes
| style="text-align:left;" | Communist Party
| PCF
| 
| 2.44
| colspan="2" style="text-align:left;" |
|-
| style="background-color:" |
| style="text-align:left;" | Jean Buessard
| style="text-align:left;" | National Front
| FN
| 
| 2.35
| colspan="2" style="text-align:left;" |
|-
| style="background-color:" |
| style="text-align:left;" | Alain Mallet
| style="text-align:left;" | The Greens
| LV
| 
| 2.24
| colspan="2" style="text-align:left;" |
|-
| style="background-color:" |
| style="text-align:left;" | Jean-Marie Soubies
| style="text-align:left;" | Hunting, Fishing, Nature and Traditions
| CPNT
| 
| 2.01
| colspan="2" style="text-align:left;" |
|-
| style="background-color:" |
| style="text-align:left;" | Marianne Ligou
| style="text-align:left;" | Far Left
| EXG
| 
| 1.85
| colspan="2" style="text-align:left;" |
|-
| style="background-color:" |
| style="text-align:left;" | Philippe Gastambide
| style="text-align:left;" | Ecologist
| ECO
| 
| 0.87
| colspan="2" style="text-align:left;" |
|-
| style="background-color:" |
| style="text-align:left;" | Régine Pointet
| style="text-align:left;" | Independent
| DIV
| 
| 0.85
| colspan="2" style="text-align:left;" |
|-
| style="background-color:" |
| style="text-align:left;" | Christian Marty
| style="text-align:left;" | Far Left
| EXG
| 
| 0.54
| colspan="2" style="text-align:left;" |
|-
| colspan="8" style="background-color:#E9E9E9;"|
|- style="font-weight:bold"
| colspan="4" style="text-align:left;" | Total
| 
| 100%
| 
| 100%
|-
| colspan="8" style="background-color:#E9E9E9;"|
|-
| colspan="4" style="text-align:left;" | Registered voters
| 
| style="background-color:#E9E9E9;"|
| 
| style="background-color:#E9E9E9;"|
|-
| colspan="4" style="text-align:left;" | Blank/Void ballots
| 
| 1.80%
| 
| 3.67%
|-
| colspan="4" style="text-align:left;" | Turnout
| 
| 67.83%
| 
| 67.20%
|-
| colspan="4" style="text-align:left;" | Abstentions
| 
| 32.17%
| 
| 32.80%
|-
| colspan="8" style="background-color:#E9E9E9;"|
|- style="font-weight:bold"
| colspan="6" style="text-align:left;" | Result
| colspan="2" style="background-color:" | PS HOLD
|}

2002

|- style="background-color:#E9E9E9;text-align:center;"
! colspan="2" rowspan="2" style="text-align:left;" | Candidate
! rowspan="2" colspan="2" style="text-align:left;" | Party
! colspan="2" | 1st round
! colspan="2" | 2nd round
|- style="background-color:#E9E9E9;text-align:center;"
! width="75" | Votes
! width="30" | %
! width="75" | Votes
! width="30" | %
|-
| style="background-color:" |
| style="text-align:left;" | David Habib
| style="text-align:left;" | Socialist Party
| PS
| | 38.15| | 53.27|-
| style="background-color:" |
| style="text-align:left;" | Lucien Basse-Cathalinat
| style="text-align:left;" | Union for a Presidential Majority
| UMP
| | 28.49'''
| 
| 46.73
|-
| style="background-color:" |
| style="text-align:left;" | Michel Bernos
| style="text-align:left;" | Union for French Democracy
| UDF
| 
| 10.06
| colspan="2" style="text-align:left;" |
|-
| style="background-color:" |
| style="text-align:left;" | Jean Beussard
| style="text-align:left;" | National Front
| FN
| 
| 6.24
| colspan="2" style="text-align:left;" |
|-
| style="background-color:" |
| style="text-align:left;" | Nicole Badetz
| style="text-align:left;" | Hunting, Fishing, Nature and Traditions
| CPNT
| 
| 3.77
| colspan="2" style="text-align:left;" |
|-
| style="background-color:" |
| style="text-align:left;" | Rene Lassalle
| style="text-align:left;" | The Greens
| LV
| 
| 3.76
| colspan="2" style="text-align:left;" |
|-
| style="background-color:" |
| style="text-align:left;" | Marcelle Estoueigt
| style="text-align:left;" | Communist Party
| PCF
| 
| 2.95
| colspan="2" style="text-align:left;" |
|-
| style="background-color:" |
| style="text-align:left;" | Sylvie Bacque
| style="text-align:left;" | Revolutionary Communist League
| LCR
| 
| 1.82
| colspan="2" style="text-align:left;" |
|-
| style="background-color:" |
| style="text-align:left;" | Joelle Coste
| style="text-align:left;" | Far Right
| EXD
| 
| 1.70
| colspan="2" style="text-align:left;" |
|-
| style="background-color:" |
| style="text-align:left;" | Sylvie Sury De
| style="text-align:left;" | Movement for France
| MPF
| 
| 0.85
| colspan="2" style="text-align:left;" |
|-
| style="background-color:" |
| style="text-align:left;" | Christian Marty
| style="text-align:left;" | Workers’ Struggle
| LO
| 
| 0.73
| colspan="2" style="text-align:left;" |
|-
| style="background-color:" |
| style="text-align:left;" | Claude Begue
| style="text-align:left;" | National Republican Movement
| MNR
| 
| 0.65
| colspan="2" style="text-align:left;" |
|-
| style="background-color:" |
| style="text-align:left;" | Xavier Piolle
| style="text-align:left;" | Independent
| DIV
| 
| 0.43
| colspan="2" style="text-align:left;" |
|-
| style="background-color:" |
| style="text-align:left;" | Veronique Dentel
| style="text-align:left;" | Far Left
| EXG
| 
| 0.40
| colspan="2" style="text-align:left;" |
|-
| colspan="8" style="background-color:#E9E9E9;"|
|- style="font-weight:bold"
| colspan="4" style="text-align:left;" | Total
| 
| 100%
| 
| 100%
|-
| colspan="8" style="background-color:#E9E9E9;"|
|-
| colspan="4" style="text-align:left;" | Registered voters
| 
| style="background-color:#E9E9E9;"|
| 
| style="background-color:#E9E9E9;"|
|-
| colspan="4" style="text-align:left;" | Blank/Void ballots
| 
| 2.52%
| 
| 4.37%
|-
| colspan="4" style="text-align:left;" | Turnout
| 
| 71.21%
| 
| 70.36%
|-
| colspan="4" style="text-align:left;" | Abstentions
| 
| 28.79%
| 
| 29.64%
|-
| colspan="8" style="background-color:#E9E9E9;"|
|- style="font-weight:bold"
| colspan="6" style="text-align:left;" | Result
| colspan="2" style="background-color:" | PS HOLD
|}

Sources
 French Interior Ministry results website: 

3